Andreas "Zecke" Neuendorf (born 9 February 1975) is a German former professional footballer who played as a midfielder.

Career
Neuendorf has played for Bayer Leverkusen and Hertha BSC. He left Berlin after the 2006–07 season, having played with the club for six years. After three years with FC Ingolstadt 04, he returned to Hertha in 2010.

Nickname
Neuendorf is nicknamed "Zecke" (German for tick), a name that was given to him by Leverkusen team-mate Ulf Kirsten after Neuendorf fell ill from a tick bite. He wears the name on his shirt, similar the common practice among Brazilian footballers, and it is listed in his passport as his stage name.

Honours
Hertha Berlin
DFL-Ligapokal: 2001, 2002

References 

1975 births
Living people
Footballers from Berlin
German footballers
Association football midfielders
Bundesliga players
2. Bundesliga players
3. Liga players
Füchse Berlin Reinickendorf players
Bayer 04 Leverkusen players
Bayer 04 Leverkusen II players
Hertha BSC players
Hertha BSC II players
FC Ingolstadt 04 players
Germany under-21 international footballers
Germany B international footballers
People from Reinickendorf